Hunolt is a surname. Notable people with the surname include:

Franz Hunolt (1691–1746), German Catholic priest and preacher